Edward J. Champagne (December 4, 1922 – June 15, 2003) was a professional American football player who played tackle in the National Football League (NFL) for the Los Angeles Rams. He attended Louisiana State University, where he played college football for the LSU Tigers football team. He played in 39 games for the Rams from 1947 to 1950. He scored the only touchdown of his NFL career—an eight-yard touchdown reception thrown by quarterback Norm Van Brocklin—in the first week of his final season.

After the 1950 NFL Championship Game, Champagne signed a contract with the Calgary Stampeders.  He played one season in Canada but injured his neck and retired from pro football.

References

1922 births
2003 deaths
Los Angeles Rams players
LSU Tigers football players
American football tackles
Players of American football from New Orleans